Into The Fight 2017 was a professional wrestling event promoted by DDT Pro-Wrestling (DDT). It took place on February 19, 2017, in Tokyo, Japan, at the Korakuen Hall. The event aired domestically on Fighting TV Samurai.

Storylines
Into The Fight 2017 featured eight professional wrestling matches involving wrestlers from pre-existing scripted feuds and storylines. Wrestlers portrayed villains, heroes, or less distinguishable characters in the scripted events that built tension and culminated in a wrestling match or series of matches.

Event
During the event, Nobuhiro Shimatani defeated Gota Ihashi in a King of Dark Championship dark match. Contrary to regular professional wrestling titles, this one is awarded to the loser of the match who is then forced to wrestle in dark matches. Having lost the bout, Ihashi was declared the new champion.

The team of Sanshiro Takagi, Toru Owashi, Kazuki Hirata and Saki Akai defeated Michael Nakazawa, Masahiro Takanashi, Tomomitsu Matsunaga and Cherry in a Loser Exiled Overseas match, thus forcing Nakazawa to leave Japan.

Next was a three-way match for the Ironman Heavymetalweight Championship. The champion going into the match was a kotatsu table in its second reign as champion after having accidentally pinned the former champion Hyota Echizenya during a brawl caused by Dai Suzuki and Gota Ihashi. During the match, Antonio Honda was defeated when he swung the kotatsu table into the ropes and it bounced back landing on top of him for the pinfall.

The next match saw the participation of Yoshihiro Takayama.

Results

References

External links
The official DDT Pro-Wrestling website

2017
2017 in professional wrestling
Professional wrestling in Tokyo